Azcuy is a Cuban surname. Notable people with the name include:

Adela Azcuy (1861–1914), Cuban nurse and poet
Filiberto Azcuy (born 1972), Cuban wrestler
Isaac Azcuy (born 1953), Cuban judoka
Liván López Azcuy (born 1982), Cuban wrestler
Maikel Alejandro Reyes Azcuy (born 1993), Cuban football player
Yanqui Azcuy Díaz (born 1976), Cuban boxer
Xiomara Rivero Azcuy (born 1968), Cuban javelin thrower